Ratalawewa is a village in Sri Lanka. It is located within Central Province.

See also
List of towns in Central Province, Sri Lanka

External links

Weather in Ratalawewa

 Ratalawewa, Central, Sri Lanka Three Day Weather Forecast | AccuWeather

Populated places in Matale District